Alexander Zverev defeated Matteo Berrettini in the final, 6–7(8–10), 6–4, 6–3 to win the men's singles tennis title at the 2021 Madrid Open. It was Zverev's fourth Masters 1000 title, his first since Madrid 2018, and his 15th career ATP Tour singles title overall. Berrettini was in contention to become the second Italian to be a Masters 1000 champion.

Novak Djokovic was the reigning champion from when the tournament was last held in 2019, but did not participate.

Following the third-round eliminations of Daniil Medvedev and Stefanos Tsitsipas, respectively, a maiden Masters 1000 singles finalist from the bottom half of the draw was guaranteed; Berrettini went on to become that player.

Seeds
The top eight seeds received a bye into the second round.

Draw

Finals

Top half

Section 1

Section 2

Bottom half

Section 3

Section 4

Qualifying

Seeds

Qualifiers

Lucky loser

Qualifying draw

First qualifier

Second qualifier

Third qualifier

Fourth qualifier

Fifth qualifier

Sixth qualifier

Seventh qualifier

ATP singles main-draw entrants

Seeds
The following are the seeded players. Seedings are based on ATP rankings as of 26 April 2021. Rankings and points before are as of 3 May 2021.

Other entrants
The following players received wildcards into the main draw:
  Carlos Alcaraz
  Pedro Martínez
  Jaume Munar
  Fernando Verdasco

The following players received entry from the qualifying draw:
  Pablo Andújar
  Marco Cecchinato
  Federico Delbonis
  Marcos Giron
  Pierre-Hugues Herbert
  Alexei Popyrin
  Carlos Taberner

The following player received entry as a lucky loser:
  Yoshihito Nishioka

Withdrawals 
Before the tournament
  Marin Čilić → replaced by  Tommy Paul
  Borna Ćorić → replaced by  Jérémy Chardy
  Novak Djokovic → replaced by  Alejandro Davidovich Fokina
  Roger Federer → replaced by  Miomir Kecmanović
  David Goffin → replaced by  Lloyd Harris
  Gaël Monfils → replaced by  Guido Pella
  Milos Raonic → replaced by  Yoshihito Nishioka
  Lorenzo Sonego → replaced by  Dominik Koepfer
  Stan Wawrinka → replaced by  Albert Ramos Viñolas

Retirements 
  Lloyd Harris
  Guido Pella

References

External links
 Main draw
 Qualifying draw

Men's Singles